The Moscow Mathematical Journal (MMJ) is a mathematics journal published quarterly by the Independent University of Moscow and the HSE Faculty of Mathematics and distributed by the American Mathematical Society. The journal published its first issue in 2001. Its editors-in-chief are Yulij Ilyashenko (Independent University of Moscow and Cornell University), Michael Tsfasman (Independent University of Moscow and Aix-Marseille University), and Sabir Gusein-Zade  (Moscow State University and the Independent University of Moscow).

External links
 

Publications established in 2001
Mathematics journals
Higher School of Economics academic journals
Quarterly journals
English-language journals